The 2007 Tour de Suisse, the 71st edition of the cycle race, took place from 16 June until 24 June. As usual, the race began with a short prologue and featured a long individual time trial. Besides, riders also had to face several mountain stages in the Swiss Alps, including the Grimselpass, a 12.1 kilometres long climb with an average gradient of 6.6% and slopes at 10%. The race also visited the neighbouring countries of Liechtenstein and Austria.

The four top finishers of the 2006 edition, Jan Ullrich, Koldo Gil, Jörg Jaksche and Ángel Vicioso did not take part in 2007, as in one way or another they were all affected by the Operación Puerto affair. Koldo Gil was the only one of these riders who was not left without a team, after Ullrich was fired by his  and Vicioso and Jaksche's team  folded.

Teams
Twenty-one teams of eight riders started the race:

Route

Stages

Stage 1
16 June 2007 – Olten,  (ITT)

Stage 2
17 June 2007 – Olten to Luzern,

Stage 3
18 June 2007 – Brunnen to Nauders,

Stage 4
19 June 2007 – Nauders to Triesenberg–Malbun,

Stage 5
20 June 2007 – Vaduz to Giubiasco,

Stage 6
21 June 2007 – Giubiasco to Crans-Montana, 

Due to a hailstorm, race officials once abandoned the stage. The stage was later restarted in Ulrichen and was shortened to 95 kilometers. The hors catégorie climb of Nufenenpass was cancelled as well.

Stage 7
22 June 2007 – Ulrichen to Grimselpass,

Stage 8
23 June 2007 – Innertkirchen to Schwarzsee,

Stage 9
24 June 2007 – Bern,  (ITT)

Final standings

General classification

Points classification

Mountains classification

Sprint classification

Team classification

Notes

References

External links

 

2007 UCI ProTour
2007
2007 in Swiss sport